New England Orienteering Club (NEOC) was founded in Cambridge, Massachusetts in 1972 to promote the sport of orienteering and develop suitable maps. Today, NEOC has over 400 members, organizes approximately 40 events per year, and has produced nearly 40 specialized, five color orienteering maps in Massachusetts, Rhode Island and eastern Connecticut.

References

External links
NEOC official website

Orienteering clubs in the United States
1972 establishments in Massachusetts
Sports organizations established in 1972